"That'll Be the Day" is a song written by Buddy Holly and Jerry Allison. It was first recorded by Buddy Holly and the Three Tunes in 1956 and was re-recorded in 1957 by Holly and his new band, the Crickets. The 1957 recording achieved widespread success. Holly's producer, Norman Petty, was credited as a co-writer, although he did not contribute to the composition.

Many other versions have been recorded. It was the first song recorded (as a demonstration disc) by the Quarrymen, a skiffle group from Liverpool that evolved into the Beatles.

The 1957 recording was certified gold (for over a million US sales) by the Recording Industry Association of America (RIAA) in 1969. It was inducted into the Grammy Hall of Fame in 1998. It was placed in the National Recording Registry, a list of sound recordings that "are culturally, historically, or aesthetically important, and/or inform or reflect life in the United States", in 2005.

Background
In June 1956, Holly along with his older brother Larry as well as Allison and Sonny Curtis went to see the film The Searchers, starring John Wayne, in which Wayne repeatedly used the phrase "that'll be the day". This line of dialogue inspired the young musicians.

Buddy Holly and the Three Tunes' version

The song was first recorded by Buddy Holly and the Three Tunes for Decca Records at Bradley's Barn, in Nashville, on July 22, 1956. Decca, displeased with Holly's previous two singles, did not issue recordings from this session. After the song was re-recorded by the Crickets in 1957 and became a hit, Decca released the original recording as a single (Decca D30434) on September 2, 1957, with "Rock Around with Ollie Vee" as the B-side. It was also the title track of the 1958 album That'll Be the Day. Despite Holly's newfound stardom, the single did not chart.

The Crickets' version
Holly's contract with Decca prohibited him from re-recording any of the songs recorded in the 1956 Nashville sessions for five years, even if Decca never released them. To evade this restriction, the producer Norman Petty credited the Crickets as the artist on his re-recording of "That'll Be the Day" for Brunswick Records. Brunswick was a subsidiary of Decca. Once the cat was out of the bag, Decca re-signed Holly to another of its subsidiaries, Coral Records, so he ended up with two recording contracts. Recordings with the Crickets were to be issued by Brunswick, and the recordings under Holly's name were to be on Coral, although the Crickets played on several of them.

The second recording of the song was made on February 25, 1957, seven months after the first, at the Norman Petty studios in Clovis, New Mexico, and issued by Brunswick on May 27, 1957. This version is on the debut album by the Crickets, The "Chirping" Crickets, issued on November 27, 1957. The recording was made with everyone performing and without additional overdubs. The B-side of the record, "I'm Looking for Someone to Love" was recorded at the same session with the same backup singers.

The Brunswick recording of "That'll Be the Day" is considered a classic of rock and roll. It was ranked number 39 on Rolling Stones list of the "500 Greatest Songs of All Time".

Charts

Certification
The Brunswick single was a number-one hit on Billboard magazine's Best Sellers in Stores chart in 1957. It went to number two on Billboards R&B singles chart. The song peaked at number 1 in the UK Singles Chart in November 1957 and stayed in that position for three weeks.

On December 20, 1969, a reissue of the single by Coral Records was awarded a "gold single" by the RIAA.

On September 20, 1986, the song appeared on the UK Singles Chart at number 85 and left the chart a week later.

PersonnelJuly 22, 1956, Bradley's Quonset Hut, Nashville 
Buddy Holly – vocals, guitar
Sonny Curtis – guitar
Don Guess – bass
Jerry Allison – drumsFebruary 25, 1957, Norman Petty Recording Studio'''
 Buddy Holly – lead guitar and vocals
 Larry Welborn – bass
 Jerry Allison – drums
 Niki Sullivan – background vocals
 June Clark – background vocals
 Gary Tollett – background vocals
 Ramona Tollett – background vocals

Linda Ronstadt version

Background
Linda Ronstadt recorded "That'll Be the Day" for her 1976 Grammy Award-winning platinum album Hasten Down the Wind, produced by Peter Asher and issued by Asylum Records. Her version reached number 11 on both the U.S. Billboard Hot 100 and the Cash Box Top 100 and number 27 on the Billboard Country Singles chart. In Canada, her version peaked at number 2 on the singles chart and was the 35th biggest hit of 1976. It also made the adult contemporary charts in the United States and Canada. This recording is included on the album Linda Ronstadt's Greatest Hits (1976) and on the 2011 tribute album Listen to Me: Buddy Holly.

Chart performance

References

Bibliography
Amburn, Ellis (1995). Buddy Holly: A Biography''. St. Martin's Press.

External links
 Lyrics of this song
 
 

1956 songs
1976 singles
1957 debut singles
Buddy Holly songs
Pure Prairie League songs
The Quarrymen songs
Linda Ronstadt songs
UK Singles Chart number-one singles
United States National Recording Registry recordings
Songs written by Buddy Holly
Songs written by Jerry Allison
Music of New Mexico
Curry County, New Mexico
Billboard Top 100 number-one singles
Music published by MPL Music Publishing
Song recordings produced by Norman Petty
Brunswick Records singles
Decca Records singles
Asylum Records singles
Coral Records singles
The Crickets songs